Chromacilla  is a genus of beetle in the family Cerambycidae.

Species
 Chromacilla discoidalis (Bates, 1879)
 Chromacilla foveata (Aurivillius, 1913)
 Chromacilla igneicollis (Hope, 1843)
 Chromacilla jossoi Juhel & Bentanachs, 2010
 Chromacilla micans (Fabricius, 1801)
 Chromacilla murphyi Juhel, 2012
 Chromacilla penanhoati Juhel & Bentanachs, 2010
 Chromacilla pujoli Juhel & Bentanachs, 2010
 Chromacilla schubotzi (Hintz, 1911)
 Chromacilla tricolor (Jordan, 1894)
 Chromacilla venus (Thomson, 1858)

References

Callichromatini